George Ede (9 May 1940 – 9 June 2012) was a Canadian biathlete who competed in the 1968 Winter Olympics.

References

1940 births
2012 deaths
Canadian male biathletes
Olympic biathletes of Canada
Biathletes at the 1968 Winter Olympics